Dasavathaaram is a 2008 Indian Tamil-language science fiction action film directed by K. S. Ravikumar. It stars Kamal Haasan, who also wrote the script, in ten distinct roles. Asin appears in two roles and Mallika Sherawat plays a subsidiary role. The plot of the film revolves around bringing together the lives of several individuals beginning with the 12th century and ending with the 21st century; the main person being a research scientist who develops a bio-weapon and makes sure that it is not acquired by a terrorist nation. Several other people also get involved in the process and all their stories connect after the striking of 2004 Indian Ocean earthquake and tsunami, thus bringing philosophical views into the picture.

The film, which had been under production for nearly three years, was produced and primarily distributed by V. Ravichandran. Primary filming locations included the United States and across Tamil Nadu in India. The soundtrack to the film was composed by Himesh Reshammiya and the background score was by Devi Sri Prasad.

After delays in post-production, the film was released on 13 June 2008 in around 1300 prints worldwide with praise directed at Haasan's multiple-role performance, the cinematography, and the editing, while criticism was directed at the prosthetics, writing and the addition of unnecessary characters portrayed by Haasan.

Plot 

Biotechnologist Govindarajan Ramaswamy speaks at the Jawaharlal Nehru Stadium and explains about chaos theory and the butterfly effect. He begins by reciting events from the 12th century Chidambaram, when Chola Emperor Kulothunga II, a Shaivite, persecutes Vaishnavites and intends to destroy an idol of Vishnu. Rangarajan Nambi, a Vaishnavite, protects it and offends the king, who orders Rangarajan to be executed by being pierced, stoned, submerged into the sea with the idol. Nambi's wife Kodhai is shocked by this and she kills herself in front of the King.

In 20 December 2004, where a nanobiotechnology lab in the United States designs a vector-virus intended as a bio-weapon following the September 11 attacks to defend further terrorist attacks on US soil. While the team members are watching a news programme, Govindarajan aka Govind notices from the CCTV visuals of his lab, a monkey named Hanu breaks out of his cage and retrieves a sample of the test virus. The monkey takes the vial, thinking it to be the usual chocolate Govind feeds him and swallows the sample of the virus. Govind and his team try to save him but is too late and they watch helplessly as he dies. Govind, saddened by the event, quarantines the lab room and fills it with a concentrated salt solution. After learning the original virus's lethal potential the hard way, Govind refuses to hand over the main single vial containing the virus due to fear of misuse. However his boss and senior scientist, Dr. Sethu has a malicious plan in mind - to sell it to a terrorist nation. Realizing this, Govind sneaks the vial out of the lab and is pursued by the security guard and the officials. Govind flees to his friend and coworker Suresh's house for refuge, who secretly betrays him.

A helicopter housing a rogue CIA agent Christian Fletcher, arrives in the middle of Govind's and Suresh's house. Fletcher fast-ropes down to Suresh's apartment with a crossbow, shoots Suresh and attempts to seize the vial. Govind flees away while Yukha Narahazi, Suresh's wife and an Aikido champion, fights Fletcher and protects Govind. Govind manages to jump into another apartment's window and escapes the building before the apartment is bombed by Fletcher. The virus is inadvertently shipped to India by Govind's friend Sairam aboard a passenger aircraft, safely in Govind's hands. Govind secretly boards the aircraft carrying the virus and changes its location. Govind later learns that the package containing the vial is being sent to Krishnaveni.

In Japan, a skilled Martial arts teacher Shingen Narahazi who is Yuka Narahazi's elder brother gets informed of his sister's murder and sets out to finish the culprit. After arriving in India, Govind is questioned by Balram Naidu, a quirky RAW operative, who immediately dislikes Govind. Govind unsuccessfully tries to explain the series of incidents, but Naidu believes him to be a member of a gang. Meanwhile, Fletcher, who has married an Indian assassin named Jasmine, arrives in Chennai. After marrying her and using her as a translator, Fletcher threatens Govind and a police officer Bharat and takes them away in a jeep, after killing two Black Cats at the airport for a clean exit from pursuing Indian authorities. The arrival of the famous pop singer Avatar Singh makes their escape easy. After exiting the city, Govind escapes from Fletcher with the help of the policeman and reaches Chidambaram. Fletcher follows him along with Jasmine, after hiring a cab, 

After Govind attempts to persuade Andal and her grandmother Krishnaveni, who are receivers of the package carrying the virus, Krishnaveni puts the vial into the idol of Lord Vishnu, asking the deity to take care of it. Watching all these events from the outside the middle of the religious festival happening in the street, Jasmine goes near the idol and looks for a minute to get the idol on hand, while suddenly, an elephant who is a part of the religious festival is inadvertently freed by Fletcher, who shoots the elephant to distract Naidu, and it goes mad with total chaos in the street. In the chaos, the elephant gets hold of Jasmine and throws her. She gets impaled on a blade on the wall. Knowing that her injuries are too fatal, Fletcher in an urge to get hold of Govind who in the middle of the chaos took the idol with him shoots Jasmine. Andal desperately runs behind Govind for getting back the Perumal idol into which Krishnaveni put the vial. Govind and Andal run away from Fletcher with the idol with several chaos and arguments between them. Her anger about taking the idol away from Chidambaram and him being worried about saving the vial from Fletcher which is into the idol now. They arrive at a ground where illegal sand miners are working. The miners try to molest Andal, but Govind defeats them and they sneak out after the interference of Vincent Poovaraghan, a social activist, and drive away from the place with one of the trucks that belong to the miners. Andal in an urge to get back to Chidambaram, forces Govind to turn the vehicle and they end up crashing a van opposite that has a large Muslim family. Andal and Govind recover from the truck and saves the family where an unnaturally tall man named Khalifulla is seen. Khalifulla's mother faints suddenly and is taken to a hospital, where Govind procures a cooling box to store the idol, as it is unstable and its temperature needs to be maintained. Avtar Singh is also there with his family for the treatment of his throat cancer. His prescription drugs are in a similar-looking box and before leaving the hospital, his family unknowingly switches it with Govind's box. Govind unaware of this goes to the police station to let them know of all the chaos happening.

Knowing this meanwhile Fletcher who spots Andal in the hospital takes Andal and Kalifulla's family hostage in their house, and Govind is blackmailed to bring back the box he is carrying. With no choice, he reaches the place only to discover that Avatar must have the vial box as the medicine box is with him. The police surround the house, and Fletcher forcefully takes away, Govind and Andal, and a small boy from the Muslim family to flee in a jeep. Shingen Narahazi (who mistakes Govind as the killer after being misled by Balram) follows them. Avatar finishes his last performance and meanwhile, Fletcher along with Govind, Andal, and the boy reaches the place for getting the box that contains the idol. In a fight between Fletcher and Govind in the place to take away the idol, Avatar is shot by Fletcher. While Avatar's wife pulls Fletcher and fights in anger for shooting her husband, Andal runs away with her idol and Govind goes behind her.

Govind and Andal flee to reach a construction site, where a chasing happens between Fletcher who reaches as soon. In the chaos and chase, the vial from the idol comes out and Govind gets hold of it. Fletcher who is unaware of this catches Govind at a point and Govind gives away the idol to Fletcher and moves from the place immediately with Andal who is unhappy that Govind has given away her idol to Fletcher. The sun dawns on 26 December 2004 and Govind gets an idea from some drainage workers to immerse the virus in a large quantity of salt to destroy it. He goes to the beach, only to be stopped by Fletcher who finds out the vial is not inside the idol. Shingen Narahazi arrives and apologises to Govind for misinterpreting him as the murderer. Narahazi fights Fletcher and defeats him. During the fight, Govind gets stabbed by Fletcher. At the same time, Balram Naidu arrives in a helicopter and asks Fletcher to surrender. At the end of the moment, Narahazi asks Fletcher how he wants to die. Caught between Narahazi and Balram Naidu, Fletcher opens the vial and bites it, getting infected and vomiting blood. Govind and Balram Naidu, who is aware of the consequence, stare helplessly at the situation when suddenly, a tsunami strikes, washing away Fletcher, and causing great destruction along the coast while stopping the impact of the vial which would have destructed the entire state.  Govind, Narahazi and Andal gets into a boat on the coast.

After the chaos Krishnaveni Paatti arrives later and cries after perceiving deceased Poovaraghan as her long-lost son (who had died 50 years ago). Khalifulla and his family as well as neighbors are safe as Balram took all of them into a far away Masjid for questioning. After relief measures are taken, Andal argues that God had sent forth the tsunami to get rid of the weapon. Govind responds by asking if God would destroy hundreds of lives to save millions. Later, they unite and expresses feelings for each other, while it's revealed that they're in front of the same idol of Vishnu that was submerged in the 12th century (which has ultimately been brought back from the ocean). Rangarajan Nambi's bones are seen on the idol.

The scene shifts to the stadium, where Avatar, who had his cancerous growth taken away by Fletcher's shot, along with all the others, listens to the speech by Govind followed by the former president George W. Bush as the credits roll.

Cast

Production

Pre-production 
Kamal Haasan came up with an original storyline and approached a number of directors, including Gautham Vasudev Menon to direct it, when K. S. Ravikumar accepted the offer. It began soon after the announcement of Sivaji: The Boss starring Rajinikanth. Ravikumar and Haasan came together for the fourth time following their three previous successful ventures, Avvai Shanmughi, Thenali and Panchatanthiram.

Development 

Kamal was set to play ten different roles in the film, making it the first time that an actor has appeared in so many roles in world cinema. Viswanathan Ravichandran signed up to produce the venture securing distribution rights in the process. Pyramid Film Fund had an exposure of 50 percent in the project.

Following nearly a year of pre-production, deciding the cast and the locations, the film began its first schedule on 11 September 2006.

Ashmith Kunder was signed up to edit the film, despite early indications that A. Sreekar Prasad would have landed the offer. Haasan also wrote the script for the film following negotiations with Sujatha, who died before the release of the film, and Crazy Mohan. Jeeva was initially announced as the cinematographer of the film, and he had taken over the role for a day of the shooting. However, the shots taken by him did not appear in the film and Ravi Varman became the director of photography.

Casting 
Between the announcement of the project and prior to the launch a year later, several actress were signed up, who then either opted out or were removed from the project. Vidya Balan was first signed up and set to make her debut in Tamil films, however due to the long inactivity of the film, Balan opted out citing date clashes with her Bollywood project. Following the removal of Balan, it was reported that each of the ten characters portrayed by Kamal Haasan in the film, would have a female lead opposite them. Actresses who were considered but failed to make the final shortlist were: Meena, Mumtaj, Kiran Rathod, Nadhiya, Kamalinee Mukherjee, Nithya Das, Meera Jasmine, and Vasundhara Das. Moreover, actresses Balan, Trisha opted out due to date clashes. Furthermore, Shriya Saran was forced to opt out of the project by the producers of her other film Sivaji: The Boss, a film built up as the rival to Dasavathaaram at the box-office.

Finally, the major female lead role was given to Asin, who was later assigned two distinct roles in the project. The second lead female role in the film went to Mallika Sherawat, for whom Dasavathaaram was her first Tamil language film. Over the course, of the production more supporting actors were added to the film, the first being Napoleon, who was signed up to portray a king in the film. Other veteran actors, Jaya Prada, Nagesh, P. Vasu, K. R. Vijaya and M. S. Bhaskar as well as a bevy of American supporting actors were roped into essay other small roles in the film. Actors, Jayaram and Vadivelu opted out of the film during the production of the project, citing date problems.

Filming 

A preliminary schedule took place before the start of the film, which featured no filming, but only the make-up tests, lasting for 25 days in the USA. The make-up used for Kamal's characters proved to create difficulties. It took nine hours to implement the make-up and it failed to stay for a long period of time. To compensate for that, he had to rest and take fluids using a straw and at the same time, refrain from making movement in the facial muscles to make sure that it was not disturbed. The technology of motion control was employed for the cinematography in the film. The filming of Dasavathaaram began on 3 August 2006 at Mahabalipuram in Chennai, where the intro song was picturised on a set created by art director Sameer Chanda. The set resembled the Airavatesvara Temple at Darasuram in Kumbakonam and scenes with Kamal Haasan in an Iyengar get-up, accompanied by over 750 extras, were recorded. Though it was initially planned to be shot in the temple itself, permission could not be obtained as the structure was a heritage site and the shooting was believed to interfere with the activities of the temple. Further plans to use a hundred elephants were shelved after the transport and accommodation for the animals was deemed impossible. However, in September 2006, Sameer Chanda was sacked from the project due to his tendency to employ only workers from Mumbai and not Tamilians, prompting Haasan and Ravikumar to remove him from the project, with his role being entrusted to Prabhakar of Virumaandi fame.

Another team member was sacked in Chengelpet when a stunt sequence was being captured by the camera; stunt master Kanal Kannan was reported to have used unparliamentarily and corporation words at the workers and that took over the public address system. Angered and humiliated by such remarks, the workers walked out of the sets refusing to work anymore and resumed duty only after the elimination of Kanal Kannan. A new stunt master, Thyagarajan was given the opportunity to take over following the controversy caused by Kannan, who had a similar problem while shooting for Sivaji: The Boss.

Major portions of the films were shot extensively in overseas locations which included the US, Tokyo, Malaysia and Thailand. A role of a foreigner, played by Haasan, was shot for in casinos in and around Las Vegas and Orlando. A song involving Kamal Haasan and Mallika Sherawat that was to be shot in US was moved to Malaysia due to problems with Sherawat's visa. The crew instead decided to shift to another destination in Malaysia and the song was shot in posh night clubs; furthermore scenes were shot at a lobby of a prominent Malaysian airport.

A Replica of the White House was erected at the Taramani Film City in India, with Haasan's makeup for the role lasting six whole hours to obtain the desired outcome. For the climax, another scene was shot dramatically above the Jawaharlal Nehru Stadium with the permission of the chief minister, M. Karunanidhi. A tsunami effect was created in Mahabalipuram and shot at a  area of land in which a  wall was created near Muttukadu. The film's final shoot occurred on 8 October 2007 at Uthandi, a coastal village.

Music 

The film was originally announced with A. R. Rahman as the music director of the film. However he opted out of the project owing to schedule clashes. Kamal, who quickly wanted the tunes, roped in Himesh Reshammiya, for whom Dasavathaaram became his Tamil film debut and only Tamil film to date. The background score was composed by Devi Sri Prasad. As the film demanded a "stylish and western" quality of music, two reels of music were initially composed and tested. A two-and-a-half-minute theme song was later composed for the promos. The background music in the second half consisted of extensive usage of violins and chorus and the entire score for the film was recorded over a period of one month, in Chennai.

The soundtrack was released on 25 April 2008 at the Jawaharlal Nehru Stadium in Chennai, which became the largest audio launch for a south Indian film. Prominent film personalities across the world attended the event, with Jackie Chan, in his first such appearance, being Hollywood's ambassador for the function. Other prominent regional Indian artistes such as Amitabh Bachchan, Mammootty, Vijay and Madhavan attended the launch. The then Chief Minister of Tamil Nadu, M. Karunanidhi, attended the event. The event saw overcrowding and the Chennai Police employed lathi charge on the streets to regain control. The event hosted by Shobana, was attended by all the artistes of the film apart from producer Venu Ravichandran, who avoids to attend public events.

Behindwoods wrote, "In spite of donning many roles Kamal Hassan has used only six songs for the movie. So the story could be expected to be a tightly edited one and should not drag. Though there are no duets here, the songs themselves could become hits if the storyline packs a punch. One must add that the songs have a decidedly 'Hindi flavour'." and rated the album 3 out of 5. Indiaglitz summarised, "Dasavatharam music is here to rock.". Rediff, however, gave 2 out of 5 stars and concluded that the album was "a mediocre listening experience."

Release

Theatrical 
The film was delayed for multiple times when scheduled for a release in 2007 and also in Pongal 2008, due to extensive post-production works and in February 2008, Venu Ravichandran announced that Dasavaatharam will be released worldwide on 10 April 2008 in the eve of Tamil New Year weekend. But due to the success of inaugural Indian Premier League season, the release of the film along with Suriya's Vaaranam Aayiram, scheduled for May 2008 release, was put on hold till 1 June 2008, the date when the tournament is concluded. In late May 2008, the makers announced the release date as 13 June 2008.

The film was shown subsequently to the Chief Minister of Tamil Nadu, M. Karunanidhi, by the request of the producer on 8 June 2008.

Pre-release record
Two days prior to the release, the film was shown to film personalities of Indian cinema at Four Films Cinema in Chennai, with the film receiving praise. The film earned a total pre-release revenue of  500 million from selling all its rights.

Distribution
Sony Pictures India distributed the film in North India, whilst Ayngaran International sold the film to cinema halls in the United Kingdom, Singapore and the Gulf. Canadian rights for the film were bought by Walt Disney Studios Motion Pictures, becoming the first distributional venture of an Indian film by the production house. Narmadha Travels acquired the rights from Aascar Films to distribute the film in the United States of America. 
 
Besides Tamil, the film was also dubbed and released in different languages including Hindi, Telugu, Malayalam, Bengali and Bhojpuri versions with the Hindi version titled Dashavtar. The Indian censor board certified the film on 24 April 2008, giving it a "U" (universal) rating, after 9 cuts were made and letting the film run for 166 minutes. The film released worldwide with 1,300 prints in all the respective languages. Tamil Nadu had 275 prints, and Karnataka had 80, with 190 prints released overseas. The Hindi version Dashavtar had an unusually high 410 prints in North India. The Telugu version had 260 prints in Andhra Pradesh including 45 prints in Nizam region. The film opened in 25 screens in Hyderabad. The Malayalam version had 85 prints in Kerala.

Marketing 
The film's theatrical trailer was released publicly on 23 April 2008, a day after it was shown to special guests, which included M. Karunanidhi at a screen. The first exclusive screening of the film, prior to release, was held on the morning of the audio launch on 25 April 2008, to visiting guests Jackie Chan, Amitabh Bachchan, Mammootty and Vijay, all of whom were full of praise for the film.

Home media
The satellite rights of Tamil version of the film were sold to Kalaignar TV for  45 million.

Legal issues 
Assistant director Senthil Kumar filed a case against the film at the Madras High Court. He claimed to have created the story of Dasavathaaram, in a script titled, Ardhanari alias Clones, and that Kamal Haasan and Venu Ravichandran had "stolen" the script and left him out of the credits, violating the copyright act. On the basis of this complaint, the Chennai police queried the actor and later accepted his explanation with the high court sending notices to Kamal Haasan and the producer Viswanathan Ravichandran announcing an interim stay on the release of the film. The film was allowed to continue with its schedules, but the case was delayed till in 2007. However, in September 2007, the Court dismissed the petition of Senthil Kumar in the case, clearing the legal hurdles for the film.

Following the audio launch on 25 April 2008, Mallika Sherawat received a police complaint against the donning of improper attire at a film function. Hindu Makkal Katchi, a splinter group of the Hindu Munnani, lodged a complaint with the police, saying that Sherawat's attire at the function to release audio-CDs of Dasavathaaram, in which Tamil Nadu Chief Minister M. Karunanidhi had been present, had "hurt the sentiments of Hindus". The actress was accused of wearing a mini-skirt and exposing her back in front of the chief minister.

In May 2008, the film was criticised by the Vishva Hindu Parishad, which claimed that the film has portrayed the clash between Shaivism and Vaishnavism which prevailed in the 12th century in the film in an objectionable manner. However, following the accusations, Venu Ravichandran announced that the film contains no controversial scenes and added that the film, based around the Hindu religion, will convert atheists to theists. The charges were cleared on 29 May 2008 insisting that Dasavathaaram did not portray Hindu culture in bad light.

Reception

Box office 

Source:

India 
Dasavathaaram completed a 50-day run on 2 August 2008. It completed a 100-day run on 20 September 2008 in four screens in Chennai.

The Chennai Corporation had given the producer special permission to hold five shows daily, which helped the film to garner the extraordinary opening. In the second weekend too, the film registered at least 95% at multiplexes and 80% in single screens. The film grossed  from 17 screens in Chennai in the opening weekend. The film grossed  all over Tamil Nadu on its first weekend. It grossed  outside South India in the three-day weekend. The film grossed  in a fortnight in Mayajaal multiplex. In Sathyam Cinemas multiplex, the film grossed  in a fortnight. The film stayed at No.1 position in Chennai box office for five consecutive weeks.

The Hindi version Dashavtar, that was released after almost one year opened to a poor 5–10% response. Dashavtar netted  in six weeks in North India and was declared a Flop. The Malayalam version of the film grossed  in Kerala in the first week. In a fortnight, the Telugu version earned  share in Nizam,  in Ceded, in Vizag, in East and West Godav.

Other territories 
Dasavathaaram grossed $4,632,719 and was ranked No.7 in the opening week, becoming the first Tamil film to reach the Top 10 at the International box office. In Malaysia, the film opened in second place, having collected $601,000 from 58 screens on the opening weekend and $1,720,780 in nine weeks.

Critical response 
Some critics felt that the plot was confusing and that Kamal Haasan's ten roles were forced, with only three relevant to the plot.

On the contrary, Rediff praised the film as "spectacular" and a "superhuman effort", rating it with 4 out of 5 stars. The reviewer concluded that the film will "go down in the history of Indian cinema as a unique experiment in the commercial circuit". Sify called the film "average", stating that it would "fall short of the huge expectation and hype it had generated." The reviewer also criticised the make-up, lamenting that "Kamal's prosthetic makeup, especially as George Bush, Fletcher and Khan, is a bit of a dampener" but claimed that Brian Jennings's special effects, "mainly of the climax Tsunami scene, are a top-class by Indian standards". The reviewer praised cinematographer Ravi Varman, noting: "[He] may take a bow, as his camerawork is glossy and superb", but noted that some of Haasan's characters like Avatar Singh and Khalifullah Khan were "unnecessarily stitched together to make it a perfect 10." Behindwoods rated the film 3.5 out of 5 and said, "In short, with unexpected twists and turns missing in the film, Dasavatharam is a make-up magic show that disappoints as drama and satisfies as a technical showpiece." but concluded, "Watch for Kamal!"

T S Sudhir of NDTV wrote, "Dasavathaaram, unfortunately, remains just a film with its USP of 10 Kamals. This Kamal does not blossom the way he did in Indian or Nayakan, Appu Raja, Mahanadi, Avvai Shanmughi or in Thevar Magan" and further stated, "One of the best in the business falters with the film's story and screenplay." Nikhat Kazmi of The Times of India rated the film 2.5 out of 5 and said, "EXPERIMENTS aren't always successful. Like Dasavatharam, Kamal Haasan's ambitious venture sees him playing ten roles which include a take on George Bush too. Daring, we'd like to insist; only the make-up and the fake appearance borders more on the comic." The Deccan Herald said, "The ten roles are awfully disparate: they are more like pantomime characters. Kamal appears too flabby and jaded. Sorry, Appu Raja (or shall we say Michael, Madana, Kamarajan) it's time you start being your age. From start to finish there is a severe decibel assault aided and abetted by Himesh Reshammiya."

Oneindia said, "After watching Dasavatharam- the so-called magnum opus of the year- an ardent fan of Kamal Hassan will ask why indeed it is called a magnum opus in the first place. Why was all the hype, tension, cases, expectations and unnecessary expenses wasted on this average film. Once again, Kamal fails to attract Tamil audiences with his own script." and gave the verdict, "Not up to expectations!" Malathi Rangarajan of The Hindu said, "The film would have worked even better had the narrative been tauter and more purposive post-interval" but concluded, "All in all, Dasavathaaram shows that Kamal Haasan has once again taken great pains to make his cinematic projects convincing. The effort has paid off." Ananda Vikatan rated the film 43 out of 100.

Accolades

Cancelled spin-off 
A spin off film Sabaash Naidu, based on this film's character Balaram Naidu, the RAW operative, was planned but eventually dropped due to financial issues.

Notes

References

Bibliography

External links 
 
 

2008 films
Films set in Chennai
Indian disaster films
Indian fantasy action films
Indian science fiction action films
Films about tsunamis
Disaster films based on actual events
Films shot in Florida
Films shot in the Las Vegas Valley
Films shot in Tokyo
Films shot in Malaysia
Films shot in Thailand
Films shot in Chennai
Films directed by K. S. Ravikumar
2000s Tamil-language films
Films with screenplays by Kamal Haasan
Films scored by Himesh Reshammiya
Films scored by Devi Sri Prasad
Films about terrorism
Films set in the 12th century
Cultural depictions of Manmohan Singh
Films involved in plagiarism controversies
Films about the Research and Analysis Wing
Indian martial arts films
2008 martial arts films
2004 Indian Ocean earthquake and tsunami
Films set in Tokyo
Films set in the Las Vegas Valley
Indian science fiction thriller films
Weapons of mass destruction in fiction
Techno-thriller films
Films about infectious diseases
2008 action thriller films
Sony Pictures Networks India films
Sony Pictures films
Disney India films